Historical ~The Highest Nightmare~ is one of the 10th anniversary albums from Nightmare.  The 2-disc album contains 12 re-recorded tracks (from before the band's move to VAP),  11 previously released songs and 1 new track.  The album peaked at #14 in the Oricon charts.

Track listing

References

2010 compilation albums
Nightmare (Japanese band) albums
Avex Group compilation albums
Japanese-language compilation albums